Sinoyuvo 'Snake' Nyoka (born 7 August 1990) is a South African rugby union player who last played for the  in the Currie Cup and in the Rugby Challenge. His regular position is scrum-half.

Career

Youth

He was then included in an Under-18 Elite squad and also made the S.A. Schools side in 2008. He also played for them in the 2010 Under-21 Provincial Championship competition.

Border Bulldogs

He quickly established himself as a regular for the senior side and represented Border in both the Vodacom Cup and Currie Cup competitions since 2010.

Pumas

Nyoka was a member of the Pumas side that won the Vodacom Cup for the first time in 2015, beating  24–7 in the final. Nyoka made five appearances during the season, scoring one try.

Representative rugby

In 2013, Nyoka was included in a South Africa President's XV team that played in the 2013 IRB Tbilisi Cup and won the tournament after winning all three matches.

References

South African rugby union players
Living people
1990 births
Sportspeople from Qonce
Border Bulldogs players
Rugby union scrum-halves
Rugby union players from the Eastern Cape